Saurabh Kumar (1983–2015) was an engineering officer with the Indian Railways, who is being hailed as one of a series of whistleblowers against Corruption in India. He was killed under mysterious circumstances in Kharagpur after having told his family about getting death threats for resisting pressure to pass tenders.

A graduate of BIT Sindri (2008), he was posted as the purchase officer in Railway stores handling large volume tenders for railway scrap.  He had told his friends and family that he had been under pressure to pass tenders by "politically affiliated mafia members." On 23 September 2015, his body, which had started to rot, was found at his official quarters in Kharagpur.  The body is reported to have had head injuries and profound bleeding.  Initially, the police refused to file a foul play FIR and declared it as a case of death by snakebite.

However, friends formed the group #JusticeForSaurabh on social media. After mounting pressure on the internet, along with TV images showing most of the bedsheet soaked in blood,  the railway minister, Suresh Prabhu, ordered a probe, and the police agreed to register an FIR for murder.

The killing is under investigation but the internet outcry continues, pointing to the police reluctance to register the murder as evidence that the investigation was sidetracked at the behest of the rail mafia.   In the days after the probe was announced, the group have tried to get political backing for a stricter probe, and a candlelight vigil was organized at Jantar Mantar in New Delhi by the political group, Swaraj Abhiyan, seeking early justice.

References

Indian whistleblowers
1983 births
2015 deaths
Indian anti-corruption activists